This is a list of people who are descended from the Old Belarusians of the Grand Duchy of Lithuania.

Archaeologists and anthropologists

Mikalaj Ulaščyk

Actors and actresses

Raścislaŭ Jankoŭski

Artists
Michail Savicki, painter

Engineers
Paval Suchi
Barys Bielavusaŭ

Musicians
Anatol Bahatyroŭ
Dźmitry Smolski
Viktar Smolski
Ihar Lučanok
Vladimir Dukelsky
Alaksandar Rybak
Maria Paula Survilla
D'Arcy Wretzky

Philosophers, humanists, and theologians
Symon Budny
Euphrosyne of Polotsk
Śpirydon Sobal
Francysk Skaryna

Scientists
Zhores Ivanovich Alferov, Nobel Prize winning physicist
Jury Bandažeŭski
Fiodar Fiodaraŭ
Barys Kit
Alena Karascieleva
Theodor Narbut
Uladzimier Platonaŭ, mathematician
Mikalaj Sudziloŭski
Jakaŭ Zialdovič

Sportsmen and sportswomen
Andrej Arloŭski
Yegor Sharangovich
Andrej Zyhmantovič
Uladzimier and Alaksandar Arciemjeŭ
Anžela Atroščanka
Viktoryja Azaranka
Śviatlana Bahinskaja
Siarhiej Hurenka
Alaksandar Hleb
Volha Korbut
Vital Kutuzaŭ
Dźmitry Markaŭ
Uladzimier Maciušenka
Alexander Medved
Raman Piatrušenka
Max Mirny
Vital Ščerba
Maria Sharapova
Julija Nieściarenka
Darja Domračava

State, revolution, military
Źmicier Daškievič
Andrei Hramyka
Alexander Lukashenko
Alaksandar Milinkievič
Zianon Paźniak
Rogneda of Polotsk
Izyaslav of Polotsk 
Andrei Gromyko
Ivonka Survilla

Writers
See List of Belarusian writers
Janka Kupala
Jakub Kolas
Kandrat Krapiva
Maksim Bahdanovič
Aleś Adamovič
Ryhor Baradulin
Mikałaj Husoŭski
Śviatlana Aleksijevič
Maksim Tank
Vasil Bykaŭ
Vital Voranaŭ
Vincent Dunin-Marcinkievič
Nił Hilevič
Ivan Šamiakin
Janka Maŭr
Uladzimier Karatkievič
Hienadź Klaŭko
Alaksandar Patupa

Fashion designers
Dmitry Sholokhov

See also
Grand Duchy of Lithuania
Belarusians
List of people from Belarus

External links
Famous Belarusians

Belarusians
People of Belarusian descent
Lists of Belarusian people